Nuribenua is the largest island of Tabiteuea atoll in Kiribati; 
It includes the old Capital village of the atoll Terikiai (a.k.a. Aanikai, and sometimes also called Nuribenua town), and the new capital village Utiroa (near the airport location).
To its south are Tauma and Kabuna islands.
To its north is Nonouti Atoll.

Populated places in Kiribati
Tabiteuea